Just Eat (formerly known legally as Just Eat plc) is an online food order and delivery brand of Netherlands-based Just Eat Takeaway.com, and a former food delivery company. Just Eat was founded as a separate company in 2001 in Kolding, Denmark, and headquartered in London, United Kingdom from 2006 until its merger in 2020. Just Eat acts as an intermediary between independent takeaway food outlets and customers. The service operates under this brand name in seven countries. The platform enables customers to search for local takeaway restaurants, place orders and pay online, and to choose from pick-up or delivery options. The company Just Eat plc acquired SkipTheDishes in Canada and Menulog in Australia and New Zealand.

It was listed separately on the London Stock Exchange until it was acquired by Takeaway.com in February 2020; the two companies were merged to form Just Eat Takeaway.com, which replaced Just Eat's listing on the London Stock Exchange.

History

Five Danish entrepreneurs, including Jesper Buch, founded Just Eat in Denmark and launched the service in August 2001. The company started with only 15 employees. In 2005 the technology entrepreneur Bo Bendtsen (co-founder) bought out all the founders and initial investors apart from Jesper Buch and moved the company to the UK. Jesper Buch moved to the UK as part of the buyout in 2006 and hired Welsh executive David Buttress to join as CEO and co-founder of Just Eat UK in March. The international expansion from the UK headquarters, starting with the Netherlands, launched in July 2007 and was followed by Ireland in April 2008.

In January 2011, Just Eat established a joint venture in India. In February, the Group raised £30 ($48) million from their Series B investment, enabling it to make 7 acquisitions in the next year:
 4 partnerships to launch new countries with local operators: Eat.ch in Switzerland in April, ClickEat in Italy in May, RestauranteWeb in Brazil in June and Alloresto in France in December;
 3 acquisitions to solidify its presence in the UK (Urbanbite to get into the corporate market) and Canada (YummyWeb purchased in April to cover the region of Vancouver and GrubCanada in October for the Ontario and British Columbia markets).

In April 2012, Just Eat further consolidated its position in the UK by acquiring fillmybelly.com. A week later, Just Eat announced its £40 ($64) million Series C funding round. The funds were partly used to launch the Don't Cook rebranding campaign in the UK and to acquire in October its main competitor in Spain, SinDelantal. After nearly five years at the helm of Just Eat, the group CEO Klaus Nyengaard stepped down in February 2013 and was replaced in May by former UK MD, David Buttress.

On 3 April 2014, Just Eat floated on the London Stock Exchange. In July, Just Eat increased to 80% its stake in Alloresto. In September, Just Eat merged its Brazilian business, RestauranteWeb, with one of its competitors, iFood, to form the joint venture IF-JE in which Just Eat had a 25% stake. In February 2015, Just Eat sold to FoodPanda its investments in their Indian JV, and continued its expansion in the Americas by launching in Mexico, via a 100% acquisition of SinDelantal, and increased its stake in IF-JE, the Brazilian JV with iFood.

In May 2015, Just Eat announced that it would buy Menulog, an Australian food ordering company for $855 million Australian dollars, and would fund the deal by issuing new shares. In July 2015, Just Eat acquired Orderit.ca, a Canadian online food ordering company, further solidifying its presence in Canada. In August 2016, Just Eat sold its operations in the Netherlands and Belgium to its Dutch competitor Takeaway.com for €22.5 million. Whereas Takeaway.com sold its UK operations to Just Eat also in 2016. In December 2016, Just Eat announced that it was acquiring Hungryhouse from Delivery Hero for £200m (with the possibility of a further £40m if the company hit performance targets) and Canada's SkipTheDishes for CAD 110M (£66m). On 12 October 2017, the Competition and Markets Authority gave its preliminary approval for the deal.

In February 2017, Buttress announced he would be leaving as CEO after four years, due to "urgent family matters". He continues on the company's board as a non executive director, and has since taken up a role with Newport, Wales based rugby side Dragons as their CEO. His departure was noted by industry commentators as a "significant loss" for the business, with Buttress having been "one of the UK's stand out entrepreneurs of the last decade".

On 29 July 2019, it was announced that Just Eat and Takeaway.com had agreed the terms for a merger of the companies in a deal worth £9bn. On 10 January 2020, 80.4% of Just Eat shareholders approved Takeaway.com's deal to acquire Just Eat plc. Although Just Eat plc became a subsidiary of Takeaway.com on 3 February 2020, the Competition and Markets Authority ordered on 4 February 2020 that no integration should take place and that the brands should be kept separate until their investigation is completed. Just Eat plc was renamed to Just Eat Limited while the investigation took place. At the time of the merger Just Eat had 3,600 employees and 26.3 million customers in 2018. Takeaway.com won over a bid for Just Eat from Prosus.

Just Eat partnered with McDonald's in January 2020 to deliver food in the United Kingdom, ending the monopoly which Uber Eats had previously exercised in the country.

On 22 April 2020, The UK's Competition and Markets Authority announced it was unconditionally approving Just Eat's merger with Takeaway.com, following an investigation.

On 2 March 2022, in a response to its announcement of losses, Just Eat Takeaway revealed plans to exit from Portugal, Romania and Norway from 1 April 2022.

On 5 May 2022, Just Eat Takeaway announced that Just Eat in the United Kingdom would be partnering with Domino's Pizza. The two launched a trial in May where ten Domino's owned stores in London would be placed on the platform. 106 Domino's franchise partner stores in the UK were expected to be on the platform by the end of May. Just Eat would be the only food delivery app in the United Kingdom to offer Domino's.

In July 2022, the company announced 390 redundancies in France, after its market capital fell following the COVID-19 pandemic.

Ireland

Just Eat Ireland launched in April 2008. In November, Just Eat acquired 250 restaurants from Eatcity.ie. Just Eat Ireland recently commissioned economic consultants DKM to carry out research on the Irish restaurant industry and found that nearly €1.5bn was spent on takeaway/delivered food by Irish consumers in 2015. DKM said that takeaway services currently account for 57% of restaurant sales and the sector is likely to grow by 17% in the next four years.

North America
Just Eat entered into the North American market in July 2009, bolstering its Canadian operations with the acquisition of YummyWeb (Vancouver) in April 2011, GrubCanada (Ontario) in October 2011 and OrderIt.ca in July 2015. In December 2016, Just Eat acquired SkipTheDishes for an initial, C$110 million. A further cash amount of up to C$90 million may also be payable, subject to certain financial targets being met in 2018 and 2019. Just Eat's existing Canadian operations were subsequently folded into the SkipTheDishes brand.

SkipTheDishes operates a food delivery service that allows customers to order from a variety of local and national chain restaurants using the SkipTheDishes website or mobile phone app. The service is widely available across most larger centres in every province in Canada. Skip was present in a limited number of American cities including St. Louis, Omaha, Buffalo, Cleveland, Columbus, and Cincinnati, but exited the US market in 2019. SkipTheDishes is headquartered in Winnipeg, Manitoba.

India
Just Eat India was founded on 26 July 2006, as HungryBangalore, by Ritesh Dwivedy. In August 2008, HungryBangalore was renamed as HungryZone. HungryZone received a first round of funding raised from the Indian Angel Network. On 17 January 2011, HungryZone announced a partnership with Just Eat. Just-Eat bought a 60% stake in HungryZone. Just Eat disposed of its shares in its India business in January 2015.

Investment

In July 2009, Just Eat received their first Series A investment funding. Index Ventures and Venrex Capital invested £10.5 million into Just Eat Holdings Ltd. The new investment capital enabled Just Eat to increase their expansion into other markets and further develop the business. In March 2011 a second round of investment saw two leading US venture capitalists, Greylock Partners and Redpoint Ventures invest £30 million. Greylock Partners have previously invested in Facebook, LinkedIn and Wonga. In April 2012, a third round of investment saw Vitruvian Partners and existing backers, Index Ventures, Greylock Partners and Redpoint Ventures, invest a further £40 million in Just Eat Holdings Ltd.

In January 2019, the company bought Flyt, the startup with software for restaurants and food suppliers. The acquisition cost £22 million.

Branding

In 2016, Just Eat UK rebranded (including a new logo) by tweaking their branding completely, with a vision to "create the world’s greatest food community".

TV advertisements UK

In late 2009, Just Eat UK began their first television marketing campaign. The adverts starred Just-Eat's mascots ‘Belly’ and ‘Brain’ and were narrated by Bernard Cribbins. The first two adverts entitled "Attention Please" and "Down and Up" ran throughout 2010. At the start of 2011, a second wave of  ‘Belly and Brain’ TV adverts were created, entitled "Listen and Learn" and "Boxing Clever".

Following a complete overhaul of their global brand positioning and launch of the Don't Cook Just Eat brand campaign in September 2012, Just Eat launched a new series of TV ads. The adverts introduce audiences to Mr Mozzarella AKA "The Mozz", Ms. Neilly, Mr Basmati, Mr Sweet and Mr Sour, Mr T-Bone, Mr Sashimi and Mr Halloumi – a hapless, motley crew of rebellious takeaway chefs, who will stop at nothing to prevent amateur chefs from cooking at home. The ads, including "Leave Cooking to Professionals", "Cooking is Dangerous", "Cookbooks," "Turn back, Cicciolina" and "The Fridge" will also air.

From 2020, American rapper Snoop Dogg appeared in Just Eat advertisements.

In May 2022, it was announced American singer songwriter Katy Perry would replace Snoop Dogg in the Just Eat advertisements.

Sponsorship
In May 2014, it was announced that Just Eat would be the primary shirt sponsor for Derby County Football Club for the 2014–15 season. The sponsorship lasted for three years until the end of the 2016–17 season.

In July 2015, Just Eat became the primary shirt sponsor for Oud-Heverlee Leuven for the 2015–16 season. In spite of the relegation of the team to the Belgian First Division B, Just Eat and OH Leuven announced on 19 May 2016 that they would continue their partnership, although Just Eat would no longer feature on the front but rather on the back of shirts for the 2016–17 season.

Just Eat sponsored the fourteenth and fifteenth series of The X Factor (UK), replacing TalkTalk.

Just Eat also sponsors the official Edinburgh cycle hire scheme, which was named Just Eat Cycles from its start in September 2018.

Starting in 22 March 2021, Just Eat became the sponsors of the UEFA men's club competitions and the women's competitions along with the other Just Eat Takeaway subsidiaries worldwide starting in the 2021–24 cycle for the UK, French, Spanish, Swiss, Italian and the Irish markets, after being awarded the first–ever confederation–wide sponsorship contract in the UEFA Euro 2020.

Business model

In the UK, Just Eat charges restaurants £699 to join the service, and for each order placed through the website or mobile app, a 13-14% commission. Over 90% of the company's revenue comes from the commissions.

Although Just Eat requires restaurants to provide evidence of registration with their local council when joining the service, a 2017 audit found 35 unlicensed restaurants with no hygiene rating. In October 2018, a BBC investigation had found that half of the takeaway outlets in England rated zero for hygiene by the Food Standards Agency in Manchester, Bristol and London appeared on the Just Eat app.

In December 2021, Just Eat has partnered with Asda to join the grocery delivery industry, marking the company's first partnership with a supermarket in the UK.

Markets
As of June 2022, the Just Eat brand operates in seven countries in Europe, those being: the United Kingdom, Denmark, Ireland, Italy, France, Spain and Switzerland.

See also
 List of websites about food and drink

Notes

References

External links
 Official website

Food and drink companies based in London
Companies based in the City of London
2001 establishments in Denmark
Retail companies established in 2001
Transport companies established in 2001
Internet properties established in 2001
2020 mergers and acquisitions
Online retailers of the United Kingdom
Online food ordering
Companies formerly listed on the London Stock Exchange
2014 initial public offerings